The 52nd edition of the Vuelta a España (Tour of Spain), a long-distance bicycle stage race and one of the three grand tours, was held from 6 September to 28 September 1997.

Route

Final General Classification Standings

References

External links
La Vuelta (Official site in Spanish, English, and French)
 Cyclingnews.com 1997 Vuelta a Espana coverage

 
1997 in road cycling
1997
1997 in Spanish sport